Louis Bernard, OQ (born 27 July 1937) is a Canadian politician and former public servant from Quebec.

Biography 
Louis Bernard is a former Chief of Staff to Parti Québécois Premier René Lévesque and former Secretary general of the Government to Parti Québécois Premiers Réne Lévesque and Jacques Parizeau. He entered the Parti Québécois leadership election in 2005 and placed fourth with 5.5% of the vote which was won on the first ballot by André Boisclair.

See also 
 2005 Parti Québécois leadership election
 Quebec sovereignty movement

References

External links
 Official leadership campaign website

1937 births
Political consultants from Quebec
Quebec civil servants
Officers of the National Order of Quebec
Living people